The 2012 Pulitzer Prizes were awarded on April 16, 2012, by the Pulitzer Prize Board for work during the 2011 calendar year. The deadline for submitting entries was January 25, 2012. For the first time, all entries for journalism were required to be submitted electronically. In addition, the criteria for the Pulitzer Prize for Local Reporting  has been revised to focus on real-time reporting of breaking news. For the eleventh time in Pulitzer's history (and the first since 1977), no book received the Fiction Prize.

Reaction to fiction prize decision
A three-member panel nominated three books, which were then sent to the 20-member Pulitzer Prize Board. Because no book received a majority of the votes from the board members, no prize was given. This was the first time since 1977, and the eleventh time in Pulitzer history that there was no winner in the fiction category.

Maureen Corrigan, a jury member, responded to the board's decision by saying, "We nominated three novels we believe to be more than Pulitzer-worthy – David Foster Wallace's The Pale King, Karen Russell's Swamplandia! and Denis Johnson's Train Dreams. That the board declined to award the prize to any of these superb novels is inexplicable."

Jury member Michael Cunningham wrote a lengthy two-part essay in The New Yorker called "What Really Happened This Year" that described the process of selecting the shortlist titles and reaction to no prize being chosen.

Lev Grossman, book critic for Time, wrote that, "I support the Pulitzer board's decision not to give out an award for fiction this year." He argued that "great" novels are relatively rare, and that there are years in which a "masterpiece" will not be published. He also cautioned against the glut of book awards, writing, "It bothers me to see great work neglected, but it bothers me almost as much to see mediocre books over-praised."

In reaction, The New York Times invited eight literary experts to pick their winners for the prize. The experts and their picks were Sam Anderson and Macy Halford: The Pale King by David Foster Wallace; Maud Newton: Pym by Mat Johnson; Gregory Cowles: The Year We Left Home by Jean Thompson; Garth Risk Hallberg: The Angel Esmeralda by Don DeLillo; Laila Lalami: State of Wonder by Ann Patchett; Alexander Chee: Silver Sparrow by Tayari Jones, and John Williams: Open City by Teju Cole.

Prizes
There were 21 prizes awarded in three categories. The prizes were announced on April 16, 2012. Each prize is accompanied by a payment of US$10,000 The winners and finalists are listed below.

Journalism

Letters and drama

Music

Special Citation
Not awarded in 2012.

Board
The Pulitzer Prizes Board 2011–2012:

 Danielle Allen, UPS Foundation Professor, School of Social Science, Institute for Advanced Study, Princeton, N.J.
 Jim Amoss, editor, The Times-Picayune, New Orleans, La. (Co-chair)
 Randell Beck, president and publisher, Argus Leader Media, Sioux Falls, S.D.
 Robert Blau, managing editor for projects and investigations, Bloomberg News, New York, N.Y.
 Lee Bollinger, president, Columbia University, New York, N.Y.
 Kathleen Carroll, executive editor and senior vice president, Associated Press (Co-chair)
 Joyce Dehli, vice president for news, Lee Enterprises
 Junot Díaz, author and Rudge and Nancy Allen Professor of Writing, Massachusetts Institute of Technology
 Thomas Friedman, columnist, The New York Times, New York, N.Y.
 Paul Gigot, editorial page editor, The Wall Street Journal, New York, N.Y.
 Sig Gissler, administrator, Columbia University Graduate School of Journalism, New York, N.Y.
 Steven Hahn, Roy F. and Jeanette P. Nichols Professor of History, University of Pennsylvania, Philadelphia
 Nicholas Lemann, dean, Columbia University Graduate School of Journalism, New York, N.Y.
 Ann Marie Lipinski, curator, Nieman Foundation for Journalism, Harvard University, Cambridge, Mass. (Co-chair)
 Gregory Moore, editor, The Denver Post, Denver, Colo.
 Eugene Robinson, columnist and associate editor, The Washington Post
 Margaret Sullivan, editor, The Buffalo News, Buffalo, N.Y.
 Paul Tash, chairman and CEO, Tampa Bay Times, St. Petersburg, Fla.
 Jim VandeHei, executive editor and co-founder, Politico
 Keven Ann Willey, vice president and editorial page editor, The Dallas Morning News

Notes

References

External links
2012 Pulitzer Prize official website

Pulitzer Prizes by year
Pulitzer Prize
2012 literary awards
Pulitzer Prize
2012 music awards
April 2012 events in the United States